The Trail of Bohu also known as Imaro III: The Trail of Bohu is a sword and sorcery novel written by Charles R. Saunders, and published by Daw Books in 1985. The Trail of Bohu was the third book of Imaro's series.

A revised version of the novel was published independently in 2009 through Sword & Soul Media and the online press Lulu.

Synopsis
Imaro, warrior of the Ilyassai, has settled into his new life as a husband and father in the fabled kingdom of Cush. Amid his growing restlessness, unspeakable tragedy strikes, sending Imaro on a grim mission of vengeance. His adversary has no face, but he does have a name: Bohu, the Bringer of Sorrow – a sorcerer of immense power and cruelty.

As Imaro seeks a confrontation with his most formidable foe yet, turmoil spreads across the continent of Nyumbani. The balance between the forces of good, represented by Cush, and evil, represented by the pariah land of Naama, has been disrupted. The gods themselves may have to declare war with one another, before this balance is finally restored.

In the midst of a coming cataclysm, Imaro travels the length of Nyumbani in search of Bohu. During his journey, Imaro finally discovers his own identity – but will this knowledge help him as he battles a formidable array of enemies bent not only on his destruction, but that of Nyumbani itself?

List of characters
The characters in this section are listed in their order of appearance.

Imaro - son of Katisa, an Ilyassai warrior decreed Benemetapa (heir) of the Monomotapa Empire
Tanisha - Shikaza woman who becomes Imaro's companion
Pomphis -  Bambuti Pygmy scholar and former jester, now friend of Imaro
Akhini - Cushite boy, son of Arkhaman
Arkhaman - Cushite master blacksmith
Kilewo - son of Imaro, five rains old
Bohu - servant of the Erriten, Imaro's nemesis
King Majnun - deposed king of Kitwana and former friend of Pomphis
Mkwayo - Imaro's father  and Monomotapa (Emperor) of the Monomotapa Empire
Katisa - Imaro's mother, now Dakamatapa (Empress/Queen) of the Monomotapa Empire

References

External links
  

1985 American novels
American fantasy novels
Novels by Charles R. Saunders
DAW Books books